Pterolophia angulata is a species of beetle in the family Cerambycidae. It was described by Hermann Julius Kolbe in 1893. It has a wide distribution in Africa. It feeds on Lagerstroemia indica.

Subspecies
 Pterolophia angulata angulata (Kolbe, 1893)
 Pterolophia angulata albocincta Gahan, 1894
 Pterolophia angulata marshalli Breuning, 1938

References

angulata
Beetles described in 1893
Taxa named by Hermann Julius Kolbe